United States gubernatorial elections were held in October and November 2007 in three states. The final results were a net change of zero among the parties. Republicans picked up the open seat in Louisiana and reelected incumbent Haley Barbour in Mississippi, while Democrats defeated Republican incumbent Ernie Fletcher in Kentucky.

Going into the elections, the Democratic Party held 28 governors' seats, while the Republican Party held 22. Democratic and Republican candidates filed in all three states, and the Libertarian Party had ballot representation in Louisiana.

Total results
At the 2007 gubernatorial elections, all 55 United States governors' seats were occupied. Of the 55 seats, 31 were held by Democrats, 23 were held by Republicans, and one was held by a third party. In this election, however, only three of the 55 seats were being contested. Two were held by Republicans, and one was held by a Democrat.

|-
! style="background:#e9e9e9;" colspan="2" rowspan="2"| Party
!  style="background:#e9e9e9; text-align:center;" colspan="2"| Popular vote
! style="background:#e9e9e9;" colspan="2" rowspan="2"| Seats won
|-
!  style="background:#e9e9e9; text-align:right;"| Vote
!  style="background:#e9e9e9; text-align:right;"| %
|-
| 
| style="text-align: left" | Republican Party
| align=right | 1,550,957 
| 50.54%
| 2
|-
| 
| style="text-align: left" | Democratic Party
| align=right | 1,316,999 
| 42.91%
| 1
|-
|  
| style="text-align: left" | Independents
| align=right | 198,263 
| 6.46%
| 0
|-
| 
| style="text-align: left" | Libertarian Party
| align=right | 2,639 
| 0.09%
| 0
|-
! colspan="2" style="text-align:left;"| Total
| align=right | 3,068,858 
| 100%
| 3
|}

Race summary

Kentucky

Governor Ernie Fletcher ran for reelection for a second term. Various polls indicated he had been very unpopular with an approval rating of 38%. Also, Fletcher's governorship had been embroiled in scandal due to the criminal indictment of several people in his administration for illegally hiring workers into the state merit system based on political considerations. Fletcher was challenged in the primary by Anne Northup, a former U.S. Representative who served Kentucky's 3rd congressional district from 1997–2007, as well as Paducah businessman Billy Harper. Underscoring the controversy over the hiring scandal, Lieutenant Governor Steve Pence chose not to run for re-election on the Fletcher ticket and publicly endorsed Northup. In addition, Northup was endorsed by U.S. Senator Jim Bunning. However, Fletcher won the primary, winning 101,233 votes (50%) and carrying 106 of Kentucky's 120 counties in a three-way race. Northup won the state's largest county, which contains Louisville, and her former congressional district, but lacked support at large; turnout in Jefferson County was not strong enough to make up for that.

A large number of Democrats ran in the primary, including State Treasurer Jonathan Miller, former Lieutenant Governors Steve Beshear and Steve Henry, businessman Bruce Lunsford and Kentucky House of Representatives Speaker Jody Richards. Lunsford spent over $4 million, much of it his own money; Miller dropped out of the race and endorsed Beshear.  Beshear won the primary with 142,516 votes (41%) in the crowded field; his next closest competitor was Lunsford with 21%.  Henry took 18% of the vote and Richards, 12%. In their election night concession speeches Lunsford, Henry and Richards each pledged their support to Beshear.

As a result of the general election on November 7, 2007, Beshear defeated Fletcher in his bid for re-election. Beshear was inaugurated on December 11, 2007.

Louisiana

Governor Kathleen Blanco announced on March 20, 2007 that she would not seek a second term. She had taken flak for the aftermath of Hurricane Katrina and the government's ill-preparedness to deal with casualties.

Republican U.S. Representative Bobby Jindal won about 54% of the vote in the October 20 jungle primary, enough to avoid a run-off in November. His nearest opponent, Democratic State Senator Walter Boasso, won about 17% of the vote; Independent New Orleans area businessman John Georges finished third with 14% of the vote; and Public Service Commissioner Foster Campbell (D) finished fourth with 12%.

Former U.S. Senator John Breaux, arguably the most popular Democratic politician in Louisiana, had publicly flirted with entering the race in March and April 2007, but eventually declined to run due to the unresolved controversy over whether his recent Maryland residency made him ineligible to run. After Breaux's announcement, Lieutenant Governor Mitch Landrieu also declined to run.

Jindal led in fundraising with $11 million raised up to the end of September, with $4.3 million of that left for the remainder of the campaign. Georges had put $7 million of his own money into his campaign. Boasso had spent $4.7 million of his own money and had $144,000 in the bank.

Mississippi

Governor Haley Barbour ran for a second term. He was popular, with a 59% approval rating, and faced only a token primary challenge. Four Democratic candidates filed to face him in the general election, including eventual nominee attorney John Eaves.

On election day, Barbour defeated Eaves, garnering 58% of the vote.

References